The 2008 Southeastern Conference football season was the 76th season of Southeastern Conference (SEC) football, taking place during the 2008 NCAA Division I FBS football season. The season began on September 13th, 2008 and ended with the 2008 SEC Championship Game on December 6th, 2008.

Rankings

Head coaches

Championship Game

Bowl games

Rankings are from AP Poll.  All times Central Time Zone.

References